Ben Adams (born 1981) is an English singer-songwriter.

Ben or Benjamin Adams may also refer to:

 Ben Adams (baseball) (1936–2005), American baseball player
 Ben Adams (track and field) (1890–1961), American athlete
 Benjamin Adams (politician) (1764–1837), American lawyer and politician
 Benjamin F. Adams (1822–1902), American farmer and politician
 Benjamin Matthias Adams (1824–1902), American Methodist minister
 Benjamin H. Adams (1888–1989), United States Navy admiral
 Benjamin C. Adams (1847–1906), Mississippi politician
 Ben Adams (Idaho politician), member of the Idaho House of Representatives

See also
Benjamin Adams House, an historic house in Uxbridge, Massachusetts